"Co-Co" is a 1971 single by British glam rock band The Sweet. It was the Sweet's second single to chart in the UK (after "Funny Funny"), peaking at No. 2 on the UK Singles Chart. Outside the UK, "Co-Co" reached No. 1 in the Flanders region of Belgium, South Africa, Switzerland and West Germany. The single was included on their debut album, Funny How Sweet Co-Co Can Be, in November 1971.

Background
Co-Co was written by Nicky Chinn and Mike Chapman in 1971.  The song was also given to Jackie Lee who sang it on her album Jackie's Junior Choice that same year.

Charts

Weekly charts

Year-end charts

References

1971 songs
1971 singles
The Sweet songs
Songs written by Nicky Chinn
Songs written by Mike Chapman
Song recordings produced by Phil Wainman
RCA Records singles
Ultratop 50 Singles (Flanders) number-one singles
Number-one singles in Germany
Number-one singles in South Africa
Number-one singles in Switzerland